The 1984 Appalachian State Mountaineers football team was an American football team that represented Appalachian State University as a member of the Southern Conference (SoCon) during the 1984 NCAA Division I-AA football season. In their first year under head coach Sparky Woods, the Mountaineers compiled an overall record of 4–7 with a mark of 2–5 in conference play, placing seventh in the SoCon.

Schedule

References

Appalachian State
Appalachian State Mountaineers football seasons
Appalachian State Mountaineers football